Endicott Creek is a  long 2nd order tributary to the Fisher River in Surry County, North Carolina.

Variant names
According to the Geographic Names Information System, it has also been known historically as:
Endicott Branch

Course
Endicott Creek rises on the Christian Creek divide about 1.5 miles northwest of Racoon (sic) Mountain.  Endicott Creek then flows southeast to join the Fisher River about 1 mile east of Raven Knob.

Watershed
Endicott Creek drains  of area, receives about 47.4 in/year of precipitation, has a wetness index of 269.21, and is about 94% forested.

See also
List of rivers of North Carolina

References

Rivers of North Carolina
Rivers of Surry County, North Carolina